Boluk Ajan (also Romanized as Bolūk Ājan and Bolūk Ajan) is a village in Aq Su Rural District, in the Central District of Kalaleh County, Golestan Province, Iran. At the 2006 census, its population was 394, in 92 families.

References 

Populated places in Kalaleh County